Grays Harbor is an estuarine bay located  north of the mouth of the Columbia River, on the southwest Pacific coast of Washington state, in the United States of America. It is a ria, which formed at the end of the last ice age, when sea levels flooded the Chehalis River. The Chehalis River flows into its eastern end, where the city of Aberdeen stands at that river's mouth, on its north bank, with the somewhat smaller city of Hoquiam immediately to its northwest, along the bayshore. Besides the Chehalis, many lesser rivers and streams flow into Grays Harbor, such as Hoquiam River and Humptulips River. A pair of low peninsulas separate it from the Pacific Ocean, except for an opening about two miles (3 km) in width. The northern peninsula, which is largely covered by the community of Ocean Shores, ends in Point Brown. Facing that across the bay-mouth is Point Chehalis, at the end of the southern peninsula upon which stands the town of Westport.

Grays Harbor is named after Captain Robert Gray who discovered and entered it on May 7, 1792 in the course of his fur-trading voyages along the north Pacific coast of North America.  Gray named the bay Bullfinch Harbor, but it was afterward named Gray's Harbor by Captain George Vancouver, whose contemporaneous explorations of the region—the ships of the two captains had met at sea, only days earlier—were well publicised at the time, while Gray's voyages were not. Gray's Harbor was the name that stuck (the apostrophe was omitted under US Board on Geographic Names guidelines). A few days later, on May 11 Gray found a navigable channel into the estuary of the Columbia River, and sailed into it, the first white man known to have done so.

Settlement of the area began in the early 1870s and was largely dependent on the lumber industry. As the forests of the eastern United States depleted, many loggers from the East and the Midwest migrated to the Grays Harbor area, as well as many Scandinavians and Finns from Europe.

The Daily Washingtonian was a daily newspaper in Grays Harbor founded by Otis M. Moore.

Islands and sandbars
Islands include:
Grass Island, near Westport
Rennie Island, near Aberdeen, the largest at 
Sand Island, almost in the center of Grays Harbor
Goose Island, near Sand Island

Protection Island is listed by USGS, but  is listed by the City of Ocean Shores as an accreted landform called Damon Point, a  park attached to Point Brown.

Named bars include Whitcomb Flats, near Westport. A large unnamed bar or island also stands off of Markham at the mouth of Johns River.

Sand Island, Goose Island and Whitcomb Flats are included in Washington Natural Areas Program. Johns River Wildlife Area, managed by Washington State Department of Fish and Wildlife, includes the Markham island.

Historic events
In the early 20th century, Grays Harbor was the largest lumber shipyard in the world. The Industrial Workers of the World led strikes in the area in 1912, 1917, and 1923. Some of these labor actions were militant, such as an armed union ship shooting at the Fearless, a scab ship in 1906.

The schooner Annie Larsen was seized at Grays Harbor on 25 June 1915 by US customs officials, later leading to what was at the time the most expensive trial in US legal history.

During World War II, harbor defenses including searchlights, 12-inch coast defense mortar, 155 mm howitzers and other guns were emplaced around Grays Harbor by Western Defense Command (see 56th Air Defense Artillery Regiment).

References

External links 
Topographic map

Bays of Washington (state)
Bodies of water of Grays Harbor County, Washington